is a Japanese animation studio established by ex-Kinema Citrus animators.  Yuichiro Matsuka founded the studio in March 2013. The company is referred to as Studio 3Hz on anime staff credits.

Works

Television series

Original video animations

Films

Video games

References

External links
  
 

 
Japanese animation studios
Japanese companies established in 2013
Mass media companies established in 2013
Suginami
Animation studios in Tokyo